David Paul Bobzien Jr. (born December 11, 1972) is an American politician. He was a Democratic member of the Nevada Assembly, representing Washoe County District 24 from 2006 to 2014. He attended George Mason University where he received his Bachelor of Arts in Government and Politics. He then received his Master of Public Administration from Boise State University with an emphasis in Natural Resources and Public Lands Policy. On January 15, 2019, Bobzien was appointed by Nevada Governor Steve Sisolak as the Director of the Governor's Office of Energy.

Legislative Service
Bobzien served in the 75th Session of the Nevada Assembly on the Government Affairs (Vice Chairman), Natural Resources, Agriculture and Mining, Education, and Transportation committees.

Awards
 2009 Assemblyman of the Year, Nevada Conservation League
 Highest-rated freshman legislator of the 2007 session (Las Vegas Review-Journal)
 2007 Freshman of the Year, Peace Officers Research Association of Nevada
 Winner, Southwest Energy Efficiency Project's Leadership in Energy Efficiency Award
 Distinguished Deed, Nevada Conservation League
 Winner, Nevada EcoNet's Golden Pinecone Award for environmental excellence as a public servant

References

External links
 
 Nevada Assembly - David Bobzien Official Government Website

1972 births
Living people
Boise State University alumni
George Mason University alumni
Democratic Party members of the Nevada Assembly
People from Washington, D.C.